Charles Hinton Moser (September 29, 1918 – May 7, 1995) was an American football coach. He was known for guiding Abilene High School to a 49-game winning streak from 1954 to 1957, which is still a Texas state record for 4A and 5A schools, though tied by Southlake Carroll HS in 2007.

Moser played college football at the University of Missouri, where he was an all-conference center on Don Faurot's 1939 Missouri Tigers football team, which went to the 1940 Orange Bowl. He began his coaching career in Lexington, Missouri, but joined the Army Air Corps one year later. He became a navigator at Kelly Air Force Base in San Antonio, Texas. After World War II, Moser coached at McAllen High School before succeeding P. E. Shotwell at Abilene in the spring of 1953. Moser retired from coaching in early 1960 at age 41, to serve as athletic director of Abilene schools. He briefly returned to coaching as offensive backfield coach under Emory Bellard at Texas A&M University..

References

External links
 Coach Chuck Moser 1918-1995
 Made to be Broken?

1918 births
1995 deaths
American football centers
Missouri Tigers football players
Texas A&M Aggies football coaches
High school football coaches in Texas
United States Army Air Forces officers
United States Army Air Forces personnel of World War II
People from Chillicothe, Missouri